Américo Brasiliense is a Brazilian municipality in the state of São Paulo.

This city is also known as Cidade Doçura ("sweetness city"), because its perimeter is surrounded by sugar cane plantations that form the basis for its economy. This is supported by cheap labor from emigrants from northeastern states, mainly from Bahia.

References

Municipalities in São Paulo (state)